Elena Igorevna Ezhova, née Kuzmina (born , in Melitopol) is a Ukraine born Russian volleyball player. She is part of the Russia women's national volleyball team and participated of the 2016 FIVB Volleyball World Grand Prix in Thailand and the 2016 Summer Olympics in Rio de Janeiro.

At club level she played for MGFSO, Universitet-Tekhnolog, Dinamo Kazan, Dinamo Moscow, Dinamo Krasnodar and Fakel Novy Urengoy before returning to Dinamo Kazan in 2014.

Clubs
  MGFSO Moscow (1996–2002)
  Universitet-Tekhnolog Belgorod (2002–2003)
  Kazanochka (2003–2005)
  Dinamo Moscow (2006–2010)
  Dinamo Krasnodar (2010–2011)
  Dinamo Kazan (2011–2012)
  Dinamo Moscow (2012–2013)
  Fakel Novy Urengoy (2013–2014)
  Dinamo Kazan (2014–present)

Awards

Clubs
 2002–03 Russian Championship –  Silver medal (with Universitet-Tekhnolog Belgorod)
 2006–07 CEV Women's Champions League –  Silver medal (with Dinamo Moscow)
 2006–07 Russian Championship –  Gold medal (with Dinamo Moscow)
 2007 Russian Cup –  Silver medal (with Dinamo Moscow)
 2007–08 Russian Championship –  Silver medal (with Dinamo Moscow)
 2008 Russian Cup –  Silver medal (with Dinamo Moscow)
 2008–09 CEV Women's Champions League –  Silver medal (with Dinamo Moscow)
 2008–09 Russian Championship –  Gold medal (with Dinamo Moscow)
 2009 Russian Cup –  Gold medal (with Dinamo Moscow)
 2009–10 Russian Championship –  Silver medal (with Dinamo Moscow)
 2010–11 Women's CEV Cup –  Silver medal (with Dinamo Krasnodar)
 2011–12 CEV Women's Champions League –  Bronze medal (with Dinamo Kazan)
 2011–12 Russian Championship –  Gold medal (with Dinamo Kazan)
 2012 Russian Cup –  Silver medal (with Dinamo Moscow)
 2012–13 Russian Championship –  Silver medal (with Dinamo Moscow)
 2014–15 Russian Championship –  Gold medal (with Dinamo Kazan)
 2015 Russian Cup –  Silver medal (with Dinamo Kazan)
 2016 Russian Cup –  Gold medal (with Dinamo Kazan)
 2016–17 Women's CEV Cup –  Gold medal (with Dinamo Kazan)

References

External links
 Profile at CEV
 Profile at Volleyball club Dinamo-Kazan

1977 births
Living people
Russian women's volleyball players
People from Melitopol
Olympic volleyball players of Russia
Volleyball players at the 2016 Summer Olympics